The North American Mustang Mk.X, also known as the "Rolls-Royce Mustang") was a British variant of the US North American P-51 Mustang using a Rolls-Royce Merlin engine in an experimental program undertaken by the Rolls-Royce company in 1942.

Design and development
In April 1942, the Royal Air Force's Air Fighting Development Unit (AFDU) tested the Allison V-1710-engined Mustang at higher altitudes and found it wanting, but their commanding officer, Wing Commander Ian Campbell-Orde, was so impressed with its maneuverability and low-altitude speed that he invited Ronald Harker from Rolls-Royce's Flight Test establishment at Hucknall to fly it.

This deficiency was due largely to the single-stage supercharged Allison engine, which lacked power at higher altitudes. Still, the Mustang's advanced aerodynamics showed to advantage, as the Mustang Mk.I was about  faster than contemporary Curtiss P-40 fighters using the same Allison powerplant.

Rolls-Royce engineers rapidly concluded that the Mustang powered by a two-stage Merlin 61 would result in a significant improvement in performance and started converting five Mustangs to Merlin power as the "Mustang Mk.X". With a minimum of modification to the engine bay, the Merlin engine neatly fitted into the adapted engine formers. A smooth engine cowling with an additional  "chin" radiator was tried out in various configurations as the two-stage Merlin required a greater cooling capacity than could be obtained with the standard Mustang radiator alone. The Merlin 65 series engine was utilised in all the prototypes as it was identical to the Merlin 66 powering the Spitfire Mk IX, allowing for a closer comparison. Due to the speed of the conversions, engines were often swapped from aircraft to aircraft as well as being replaced by newer units.

Testing
Air Ministry official, Air Chief Marshal Sir Wilfrid Freeman (Chief Executive at the Ministry of Aircraft Production - MAP) lobbied vociferously for Merlin-powered Mustangs, insisting two of the five experimental Mustang Mk Xs be handed over to Carl Spaatz for trials and evaluation by the U.S. Eighth Air Force in Britain. In this Freeman was greatly assisted by the US Assistant Air Attaché to London, Thomas Hitchcock Jr. After sustained lobbying at the highest level, American production started in early 1943 of a North American-designed Mustang patterned after a P-51 Mustang prototype originally designated the XP-78 that utilised the Packard V-1650-3 Merlin engine replacing the Allison engine.

The pairing of the P-51 airframe and Merlin engine was later designated P-51B for the model NA-102 (manufactured at Inglewood, California) or P-51C for the model NA-103 (manufactured at a new plant in Dallas, Texas from summer 1943). The RAF named both these models Mustang Mk.III.

Variants

Mustang Mk.X conversions:

 AG518: Used for engine installation studies, but due to a lack of guns, armour and wireless equipment, it was deemed by Rolls-Royce to be "below" latest production standards and not converted.
 AM121: This aircraft arrived at the Rolls-Royce Flight Test Establishment at Hucknall on 7 June 1942 and was the first to be delivered but the last to be converted. A broader chord fin was installed but the aircraft was not slated for testing at Hucknall and instead was sent to RAF Duxford before being loaned to the 8th Fighter Command USAAF at Bovingdon along with AL963.
 AL963: First used for performance and handling trials of the Mustang I before conversion on 2 July 1942; its nose contours had a much "sleeker" appearance due to the intercooler radiator being relocated to the main radiator duct. Other changes included a small fin extension and the "blanking" of cowling louvres. It was sent to the USAAF Air Technical Section at Bovington for evaluation.
 AL975/G: First used for performance and handling trials of the Mustang I before conversion on 2 July 1942; flying for the first time on 13 October 1942. The aircraft was identifiable by a bulged lower engine cowling and was also fitted with a four-blade Spitfire Mk IX propeller.
 AM208: The second conversion had the front radiator flap sealed permanently giving a  boost. The same modification was subsequently made to all test aircraft.

Advanced developments

In June 1943, Rolls-Royce proposed to re-engine the Mustang with a Griffon 65, although the resultant "Flying Test Bed" (F.T.B.) would involve a dramatic redesign. Three surplus Mustang I airframes were allotted by the Ministry of Aircraft Production (MAP) and were dismantled in order to provide the major components for a mid-amidships installation of the more powerful Griffon engine, somewhat like the V-1710 Allison installation in both the American Bell P-39 Airacobra and Bell P-63 Kingcobra. The project culminated in a mock-up, albeit with a Merlin 61 temporarily installed, serialed as AL960, that was examined by representatives from the Ministry in 1944, but was not given priority status. Further studies involving more powerful engines or turboprops were not given approval and the development contract was cancelled in 1945 with the mock-up being destroyed.

Operators

 Royal Air Force

 United States Army Air Forces

See also

References

Notes

Bibliography

 Birch, David. Rolls-Royce and the Mustang. Derby, UK: Rolls-Royce Heritage Trust, 1987. .
 Delve, Ken. The Mustang Story. London: Cassell & Co., 1999. .
 Gruenhagen, Robert W. Mustang: The Story of the P-51 Mustang. New York: Arco Publishing Company, Inc., 1969. .

External links

 Ronnie Harker: "The Man Who Put the Merlin in the Mustang" Retrieved: 28 July 2014.
 Rolls-Royce Merlin History and Development Retrieved: 28 July 2014.

Mustang
1940s British fighter aircraft
1940s United States fighter aircraft
Single-engined tractor aircraft
Low-wing aircraft
North American P-51 Mustang
World War II British fighter aircraft